The following lists events that happened during 1981 in South Africa.

Incumbents
 State President: Marais Viljoen.
 Prime Minister: P.W. Botha.
 Chief Justice: Frans Lourens Herman Rumpff.

Events

January
 25 – The largest part of the town Laingsburg is swept away within minutes by one of the strongest floods ever experienced in the Great Karoo.
 30 – The South African Defence Force launches Operation Beanbag and raids a suspected Umkhonto we Sizwe safe area in the suburb of Matola, Maputo, Mozambique, killing 12 to 24 people. The numbers reported killed vary.

February
 9 – Tuks FM (107.2FM), the University of Pretoria's campus radio station, is established.
 Two people are injured when a bomb explodes in a Durban shopping centre.

April
 1 – The South African Railways and Harbours changes its name to the South African Transport Services.
 14 – A section of railway line between Richards Bay and Vryheid is destroyed by Umkhonto we Sizwe and coal trucks are derailed.
 16 – Bishop Desmond Tutu is arrested and his passport is confiscated.
 21 – Limpet mines explode and destroy two transformers at a sub-station in Durban.

May
 6 – The railway in the Hoedspruit area is damaged.
 14 – The United Nations General Assembly publishes a blacklist of 65 multi-national companies and some 270 sports persons who have links with South Africa.
 21 – A bomb explodes and damages the Port Elizabeth rail link to Johannesburg and Cape Town.
 25 – A pamphlet bomb explodes in Durban.
 25 – The Fort Jackson Police station is attacked.
 25 – The railway line near Soweto is damaged.
 25 – The railway line on the Natal South Coast is damaged.
 25 – Power lines are cut in Vrede.
 25 – A series of terrorist actions in support of Republic Day protests are admitted by Umkhonto we Sizwe.
 27 – A bomb explodes in Durban destroying a South African Defence Force recruiting building.

June
 1 – Three offices of the Progressive Federal Party are firebombed in Johannesburg, with no injuries.
 4 – The police station in Meyerton is attacked by terrorists.
 11 – The railway line on the Natal North coast is maliciously damaged.
 16 – The railway line near East London is maliciously damaged.
 26 – Two bombs explode at the Durban Cenotaph.
 28 – The railway near Empangeni is maliciously damaged.
 30 – Zwelakhe Sisulu, President of the Black Media Workers Association of South Africa, is arrested under the Internal Security Act.

July
 3 – A limpet mine is found at the fuel storage yard in Alberton and defused.
 21 – Six bomb explosions at sub-stations in Pretoria, Middelburg, and Ermelo disrupt power supply.
 26 – Two bombs explode at 05:50 and 06:10 in central Durban. Three people are injured and extensive damage is caused to motor vehicle firms.

August
 6 – A bomb explodes in an East London shopping complex minutes before rush hour.
 8 – A bomb explodes in a Port Elizabeth shopping centre in similar manner to the East London bomb.
 11 – The Voortrekkerhoogte Military Base outside Pretoria is attacked with RPG-7s. Two British citizens, Nicolas Heath and Bonnie Lou Muller, are identified as accomplices in the assault.
 19 – The railway line near East London is maliciously damaged.
 23 – The South African Defence Force attacks South-West Africa People's Organisation bases in Xangongo and Ongiva, southern Angola during Operation Protea.

September
 2 – Two policemen and two civilians, one a child, are killed during an attack on Mabopane Police station.
 12 – A bomb damages the main railway line at Delville Wood near Durban.

October
 10 – Umkhonto we Sizwe attacks government offices of the Department of Co-operation and Development. Four civilians are injured.
 21 – Umkhonto we Sizwe destroys a transformer in Evander and a water pipeline feeding Sasol III (Secunda CTL) in Secunda.
 26 – Two policemen are killed during an attack on Sibasa Police station.

November
 1 – The Jeppes Reef House near the Swaziland border, occupied by the South African Defence Force, comes under RPG-7 attack.
 1 – The South African Defence Force attacks South-West Africa People's Organisation bases in Chitequeta, south-eastern Angola, during Operation Daisy.
 9 – A bomb explodes at the Orlando Magistrates Court in Soweto.
 12 – Rosslyn sub-station in Pretoria is damaged by 4 limpet mines.
 27 – Cedric Mayson, a former Methodist minister, is arrested.

December
 4 – South Africa grants Ciskei independence.
 9 – The offices of the Chief Commissioner of the Department of Co-operation and Development in Cape Town is attacked.
 14 – A Pretoria sub-station is bombed.
 23 – Eastern Cape provincial buildings in Duncan Village are damaged in an Umkhonto we Sizwe attack.
 26 – The Wonderboompoort Police station is attacked.

Unknown date
 Trevor Manuel becomes the General Secretary of the Cape Areas Housing Action Committee.
 Bulelani Ngcuka is detained by police for eight months.
 A Security Police counter-insurgency unit is started by Dirk Coetzee, Jan Viktor and Jac Buchner with 16 police officers at Vlakplaas.

Births
 13 January – Ayanda Borotho, actress
 22 January – Khabonina Qubeka, actress, TV presenter, dancer, choreographer, fitness & wellness coach
 1 February – Graeme Smith, cricketer
 3 February – Jo-Ann Strauss, 2001 Miss South Africa
 10 February – Maggie Benedict, actress
 11 February – Alexander Peternell, equestrian rider
 15 February – Lee-Anne Pace, golfer
 20 February – Akona Ndungane, rugby player
 20 February – Odwa Ndungane, rugby player
 24 February – Jean De Villiers, Springboks captain
 26 February – Bridget Masinga, 3rd in the 2002 Miss South Africa pageant, actress, television and radio personality
 3 March – Julius Malema, Member of Parliament and the founder & leader of the Economic Freedom Fighters
 16 April – Nasief Morris, football player
 16 April – Gareth Echardt, figure skater
 4 May – Jacques Rudolph, cricketer
 11 May – Terry Pheto, actress
 21 May – Jacques le Roux, tenor singer
 26 May – Zakes Bantwini, musician, recording artist and record producer.
 29 May – Iain Evans, field hockey player
 10 June – Albie Morkel, cricketer
 12 June – Gurthrö Steenkamp, rugby player
 19 June – Quintin Geldenhuys, South African-born Italian rugby player
 19 June – Dorian James, badminton player
 22 June – Linda Mkhize, rapper and producer (d. 2018)
 6 July – Jenna Challenor, long-distance runner
 30 July – Juan Smith, rugby player
 4 September – Lesley Manyathela, football player (d. 2003)
 8 September – Ashwin Willemse, rugby player & tv rugby analyst
 29 September – Siyabonga Sangweni, football player
 19 October – Lucas Thwala, football player
 18 December- Bernard de Jager, South African Pen and Ink Artist
 22 December – Tumi Morake, comedienne, actress & TV personality
 26 December – Shu-Aib Walters, football player

Deaths
 19 November – Griffiths Mxenge, activist. (b. 1935)

Railways

Locomotives
 5 February – Rebuilding of the Class 26 4-8-4 steam locomotive, popularly known as the Red Devil, is completed at the Salt River Works in Cape Town.
 Two new Cape gauge locomotive types enter service on the South African Railways:
 May – One hundred Class 37-000 General Motors Electro-Motive Division type GT26M2C diesel-electric locomotives.
 The first of eighty-five Class 6E1, Series 9 electric locomotives.

Sports

Athletics
 17 October – Mark Plaatjes wins his first national title in the men's marathon, clocking 2:16:17 in Potchefstroom.

Rugby
 30 May – The South African Springboks beat Ireland 23–15.
 6 June – The Springboks beat Ireland 12–10.
 14 August – The South African Springbok tour in New Zealand elicits protests.

References

South Africa
Years in South Africa
History of South Africa